The Bichigiu is a right tributary of the river Sălăuța in Romania. It flows into the Sălăuța between Telciu and Coșbuc.

References

Rivers of Romania
Rivers of Bistrița-Năsăud County